
An engine house is a building or other structure that holds one or more engines.  It is often practical to bring engines together for common maintenance, as when train locomotives are brought together.

Types of engine houses include:
 motive power depots (MPD), where locomotives are stored and maintained
 Buildings that housed a steam engine on a mine. Many of these have survived in Cornwall, England, for example at Crown Mines
 Buildings that housed a pumping engine for an atmospheric railway
House-built engines, where the engine is the house.  A house-built engine is a large beam engine where the engine house itself forms the frame of the engine.
Fire stations, which hold fire engine trucks, are often termed engine houses, perhaps especially in United States.

Examples
Notable examples, not including fire stations, include:

in Australia
Numerous historic sites listed on the Victoria Heritage Register

in England
 The South Devon Railway engine houses, built for Brunel's atmospheric railway
 The hydraulic engine house, Bristol Harbour
 The Tardebigge Engine House, a former canal-pumping engine house in Worcestershire, England
 Cobb's Engine House which housed a steam pump, in Rowley Regis, West Midlands, England
 "Engine House No. 2" housing the Markfield Beam Engine, Tottenham, London
 The Brunel Engine House in Rotherhithe, London, housing the Brunel Museum
 A museum opened in 2008 at the Severn Valley Railway

in the United States

Non-fire station ones in the U.S. include:
Belt Railroad Engine House and Sandhouse, San Francisco, California
Rockland Turntable and Engine House, Rockland, Maine
Cleveland Mine Engine House Number 3, Ishpeming, Michigan
Winona and St. Peter Engine House, Winona, Minnesota
Gloucester City Water Works Engine House, Gloucester City, New Jersey
Stewartstown Engine House, Stewartstown Railroad, Stewartstown, Pennsylvania

See also
List of fire stations
List of pumping stations

References

Buildings and structures by type
Engine House